There are approximately sixteen nationally recognized public holidays in Eritrea, a country in the Horn of Africa. The primary national holiday is Independence Day (24/05), Martyrs Day (20/06) and Revolution Day (September 1 - 01/09). Other commemorative public holidays include Fenkil Day—commemorating the Battle of Massawa (February 10 - 10/02) and Afabet Day—commemorating the Battle of Afabet (20/03).  Additional holidays follow the calendar of the Eritrean Orthodox Tewahedo Church and the two holy Eids (Eid Aladaha and Eid Al-Fitir)  Muslim holidays are observed as public holidays in Eritrea.

Public holidays

References

External links

Eritrea Public Holidays

Eritrean culture
Eritrbea
Society of Eritrea
Holidays
Eritrea